Sangita Patel (born January 2, 1979) is a Canadian television personality, currently the host of HGTV's Home to Win and an on-air personality of Entertainment Tonight Canada.

Life and career
Patel completed her university degree in electrical engineering in 2002. After working for a few years as an engineer and obtaining her P. Eng designation, her career path took a sharp turn. Volunteer positions in various media outlets eventually led to a position as a weather presenter on The Weather Network.

Her transition continued after she accepted a position as the weekend weather anchor on CP24. She branched into entertainment and lifestyle when she began filing segments for her very own segment on CityNews called In the City, and later became a regular fill-in on Breakfast Television for both the Weather and Live Eye segments.

She initially joined Entertainment Tonight Canada as a co-host during Cheryl Hickey's maternity leave.

She has also been featured on ET Canada's beauty campaign with Shoppers Drug Mart in 2015. She was part of the holiday season campaign for President's Choice Insiders Collection, aired on the Food Network in December 2015. She was also featured in L'Oréal’s launch of their Extraordinary Oils hair line on their digital platform.
She lives in Toronto with her husband and two daughters Ava and Shyla.

Other
In 2014, she was named one of Hello Magazine Canada 50 most beautiful list.

References

1979 births
Canadian television hosts
Canadian women television hosts
Living people
Global Television Network people
People from Toronto
University of Toronto alumni
Canadian people of Gujarati descent
Canadian people of Indian descent